Alex Shaw (born  in Ajax, Kent, England) is a rugby union player for Doncaster Knights in the RFU Championship. He previously played for Sale Sharks in the Premiership and Nottingham in the RFU Championship. He plays in the back-row. Alex is now working in as a scout leader in Cheshire and in 2018 starred in the independent screen play ‘Men in tight spaces’.

External links
Sale Sharks profile

1987 births
Living people
English rugby union players
Sale Sharks players
Nottingham R.F.C. players
Rugby union players from Kent